Bonnerveen is a hamlet in the Dutch province of Drenthe. It is a part of the municipality of Aa en Hunze, and lies about 18 km east of Assen.

The statistical area "Bonnerveen", which can also include the surrounding countryside, has a population of around 100.

References

Populated places in Drenthe
Aa en Hunze